Dry Lake is a reservoir in the U.S. state of Nevada.

Dry Lake was named for the fact it often contained little water.

References

Lakes of Churchill County, Nevada